A List of Czech films of the 1920s.

1920s
Czech
Films